Clinton is a census-designated place (CDP) in Missoula County, Montana, United States. It is part of the 'Missoula, Montana Metropolitan Statistical Area'. The CDP was named for General Sir Henry Clinton. The population was 1,052 at the 2010 census, an increase from its population of 549 in 2000.

Originally established in 1883 as a stage stop and post office, the town name was changed in 1892 to honor C. L. Clinton, an official of the Northern Pacific Railroad.

Geography
Clinton is located at  (46.775792, -113.715031).

Demographics

As of the census of 2010, there were 1,052 people, 204 households, and 153 families residing in the CDP. The population density was 278.6 people per square mile (107.6/km2). There were 216 housing units at an average density of 109.6 per square mile (42.3/km2). The racial makeup of the CDP was 95.81% White, 0.36% African American, 1.64% Native American, 0.18% Asian, and 2.00% from two or more races. Hispanic or Latino of any race were 0.36% of the population.

There were 204 households, out of which 39.7% had children under the age of 18 living with them, 55.9% were married couples living together, 12.3% had a female householder with no husband present, and 25.0% were non-families. 20.6% of all households were made up of individuals, and 3.4% had someone living alone who was 65 years of age or older. The average household size was 2.69 and the average family size was 3.07.

In the CDP, the population was spread out, with 30.4% under the age of 18, 7.1% from 18 to 24, 33.0% from 25 to 44, 22.4% from 45 to 64, and 7.1% who were 65 years of age or older. The median age was 33 years. For every 100 females, there were 101.8 males. For every 100 females age 18 and over, there were 100.0 males.

The median income for a household in the CDP was $31,731, and the median income for a family was $32,188. Males had a median income of $29,643 versus $22,500 for females. The per capita income for the CDP was $12,510. About 16.0% of families and 19.2% of the population were below the poverty line, including 28.3% of those under age 18 and 20.7% of those age 65 or over.

See also
Testicle Festival

References

Census-designated places in Missoula County, Montana
Census-designated places in Montana